Sinp'ung Stadium(신풍경기장) is a multi-use stadium in Wŏnsan, North Korea, built in May 1965, with a capacity of 30,000 spectators.

References

See also 
 List of football stadiums in North Korea

Football venues in North Korea
Sports venues in North Korea
Sports venues completed in 1965
1965 establishments in North Korea
Buildings and structures in Kangwon Province